The Florida Suncoast (or Florida Sun Coast) is a local marketing name for the west-central peninsular Florida coastal area, also sometimes known as Florida's Beach communities. The name comes from the coast receiving the most days of sunshine per year.

Cities and counties
The Suncoast region includes the western central Florida cities of St. Petersburg, Clearwater, Largo, Dunedin,  Tarpon Springs, Tampa, Brandon, Ruskin, Sarasota and Bradenton, among others. Many of the beach communities on the Gulf of Mexico are individually-incorporated cities, such as St. Pete Beach, Treasure Island, Madeira Beach, and Indian Rocks Beach. An exception is Clearwater Beach, which is part of the city of Clearwater.

Visit Florida, the state's official tourism marketing corporation, defines the Suncoast region as the 20 barrier islands in the Clearwater/St. Petersburg area of central west Florida.

See also

 Tampa Bay area
 Central Florida
 Southwest Florida
 Nature Coast - to the north

References

Gulf Coast of the United States
Regions of Florida
Coasts of Florida